Capitão Fausto are a Portuguese bubblegum pop band from Lisbon, formed in 2009. The band consists of Tomás Wallenstein (vocals, guitar, keyboards), Manuel Palha (guitar, keyboards), Francisco Ferreira (keyboards), Domingos Coimbra (bass)and Salvador Seabra (drums). There are several stories on to why the band is named "Capitão Fausto", no version has been officially confirmed. 

Their albums Capitão Fausto Têm os Dias Contados (2016) and A Invenção do Dia Claro (2019) reached number-one in the Portuguese album charts.

Members 

 Tomás Wallenstein– vocals, guitar, keyboards
 Manuel Palha – guitar, keyboards
 Francisco Ferreira – keyboards
 Domingos Coimbra – bass
 Salvador Seabra – drums

Discography

Studio albums

References

External links 

 Official website

Portuguese rock music groups
Portuguese indie rock groups
Musical groups established in 2009
2009 establishments in Portugal
Musical quintets